The 2010–11 Cuban National Series is the 50th edition of the tournament. It began on Sunday, November 28 with a game between Villa Clara and Industriales, with Villa Clara winning 6-5. The All-Star Game will be played on February 6, 2011. The regular season finished on March 24.

Regular season standings

West

East

Playoffs

League leaders

Cuban National Series seasons
Cuban National Series
Cuban National Series
2010 in Cuban sport